Juan Antonio Ribeyro Estada (1810 – December 16, 1886) was a 19th-century Peruvian politician. He was Prime Minister of Peru (1863 – August 1864). He was President of the Supreme Court of Peru (1858, 1861, 1870, 1877, 1879–1884, 1886). He served in the Chamber of Deputies of Peru.

Family Tree

References

Bibliography
 Basadre Grohmann, Jorge (1998) Historia de la República del Perú. 1822 - 1933, 8th edition, Volumes 5-7, Editada por el Diario "La República" de Lima y la Universidad "Ricardo Palma". Impreso en Santiago de Chile, 
 Tauro del Pino, Alberto (2001) Enciclopedia ilustrada del Perú : síntesis del conocimiento integral del Perú, desde sus orígenes hasta la actualidad. 3rd edition. Volume 14. Lima: PEISA. 
 Vargas Ugarte, Rubén: Historia General del Perú. Tomo IX. Primera Edición. Editor Carlos Milla Batres. Lima, Perú, 1971.

1810 births
1886 deaths
19th-century Peruvian lawyers
People from Lima
Members of the Chamber of Deputies of Peru
Presidents of the Supreme Court of Peru